Ammar Abdul-Hussein Ahmad Al-Asadi (born 13 February 1993) is an Iraqi footballer who plays as a second striker and sometimes as a winger for Naft Maysan in Iraqi Premier League.

International debut
On December 3, 2012, Ammar made his full international debut against Bahrain in a friendly match, which the match was ended 0–0.

Style of play
Ammar Abdul-Hussein is a skilled dribbler and static playmaker who can possess the ball and drive the team forward.

International statistics

Iraq national under-20 team goals
Goals are correct excluding friendly matches and unrecognized tournaments such as Arab U-20 Championship.

Iraq national under-23 team goals
Goals are correct excluding friendly matches.

Honours

Club
Erbil SC
 2011–12 Iraqi Premier League: Champion
 2012 AFC Cup runners-up

Al Shorta
 2018–19 Iraqi Premier League: Champion

International
Iraq Youth team
 2012 AFC U-19 Championship: runner-up
 2013 FIFA U-20 World Cup: 4th Place
Iraq National football team
 2012 WAFF Championship: runner-up

References

External links
 

1993 births
Living people
Sportspeople from Basra
Iraqi footballers
Association football midfielders
Al-Mina'a SC players
Al-Shorta SC players
Iraq international footballers